The 1973 Coliseum Mall International – Doubles was an event of the 1973 Coliseum Mall International tennis tournament. Ilie Năstase and Ion Țiriac were the defending champions, but did not compete together in this edition. Second-seeded Clark Graebner and Ilie Năstase won the doubles title, defeating Jimmy Connors and Ion Țiriac in the final, 6–2, 6–1 .

Seeds

Draw

References

External links
 ITF tournament edition details

Tennis in Virginia